P. endophyticus may refer to:

Phycicoccus endophyticus, a Gram-positive bacterium.
Pseudoclavibacter endophyticus, a Gram-positive bacterium.
Pseudogracilibacillus endophyticus, a Gram-positive bacterium.
Pseudonocardia endophytica (synonym for Pseudonocardia endophyticus), a Gram-positive bacterium.